Blaze and the Monster Machines is a CGI-animated computer-animated interactive children's television series with a focus on teaching STEM (science, technology, engineering and mathematics) that premiered on Nickelodeon on October 13, 2014. The series revolves around Blaze, a monster truck, and his driver, AJ, as they have adventures in Axle City and learn about various STEM concepts which help them on their way. Joining them is the human mechanic Gabby and their monster truck friends Stripes, Starla, Darington and Zeg as well as their rival Crusher and his sidekick Pickle. Then later on, Watts join the main cast in Season 3.

Series overview

Episodes

Season 1 (2014–15)

Season 2 (2015–16)

Season 3 (2016–18)

Season 4 (2018–19)

Season 5 (2019–20)

Season 6 (2020–22)

Season 7 (2022–23)

Shorts (2020) 
 Monster Machine Halloween 
 The Monster Machine Christmas Extravaganza 
 Blaze Family Photos 
 Pickle's Ocean Adventures
 Pickle's Pirate Professionals

Notes

References 

Lists of American children's animated television series episodes
Lists of Canadian children's animated television series episodes
Lists of Nickelodeon television series episodes